Jason Wisdom is the lead vocalist and bass guitarist for the Christian progressive death metal band Becoming the Archetype. Though he was born and raised in a Christian home, he states that he was never committed to Christianity until high school. He considers his music as a form of ministry, but wishes to avoid a "preachy" stereotype. His influences include Extol, Living Sacrifice, and Mortification among others. Wisdom notes that even though his music is Christian metal, many of his fans are not Christians and are many times the ones who defend his music. Wisdom left the band in late November 2011 to take care of his family (although he would return to the band in 2022). Though current 7 Horns 7 Eyes frontman, JJ Polachek, tried out, Wisdom was replaced by former live fill in, Chris McCane. He  started a solo project titled Death Therapy, which features no guitars. He currently works for RYFO, a company that helps musicians with places to stay, meals and other such things.

History

Becoming the Archetype (1999–2011, 2022–present)
Wisdom's musical career started in 1999, when he helped form Technical death metal band, Becoming the Archetype with guitarists Sean Cunningham and Jon Star, bassist Wes Gaither, and drummer Brent "Duck" Duckett. The band was not originally called Becoming the Archetype, as it was formerly called Nonexistent Failure. The band recorded a demo under this moniker, before changing the name again to The Remnant. The band recorded a demo and a their self titled album under this name. Around 2003-2004 the band played Cornerstone Festival, where they met the musicians in Demon Hunter. The members of DH told the members of the band to change their name, so they would not be confused with the punk band The Remnants. The band again changed their name to Becoming the Archetype. The band went over several line-up changes with the exception of Wisdom, Duck and founding BTA guitarist (who had nothing to do with Nonexistent Failure or The Remnant) Seth Hecox. The band recorded four albums, titled Terminate Damnation, The Physics of Fire, Dichotomy, and Celestial Completion, before Wisdom and Duck left the band, on November 14, 2011. In 2022, Wisdom revived BTA alongside Duck and Hecox, releasing a new album, Children of the Great Extinction, on August 26th, 2022.

Solamors (2012–2015)
Beginning in 2012, Jason joined with guitarist Alex Kenis (Aletheian, ex-Becoming the Archetype) and drummer Travis Turner (ex-Aletheian, UnTeachers) to begin their band Solamors based in Philadelphia, Pennsylvania. The band's influences are Death, Emperor, Cynic, Becoming the Archetype, Aletheian, The Burial, Black Crown Initiate, Demon Hunter, Devin Townsend, Strapping Young Lad, Extol. Wisdom left the band in 2015.

Death Therapy (2015–present)
Death Therapy is Wisdom's solo project that was originally conceived in 2010, but started recording in 2015. He recorded a single titled "Possessed" and was released on November 9, 2015. Wisdom was planning on releasing an EP and touring in 2016. The project's influences are Tool, Opeth, and Devin Townsend. On October 30, 2016, Wisdom announced that Death Therapy had signed to Solid State Records and would be releasing a new album, by around February 2017. The band released two songs titled "Slow Dance (With Death)" and "Self Mind Dead" which features Andrew Schwab of Project 86. Death Therapy released their album The Storm Before the Calm on February 24, 2017. In 2019, Wisdom released Death Therapy's second album, Voices, on April 12th. After releasing the EP Dance Therapy: Pre-apocalyptic Cyber Funk for Late Stage Humanoids in 2020, Death Therapy issued Melancholy Machines, their third studio album, on June 4th 2021.

Bands 
Current
 Death Therapy – vocals, bass (2015–present)
 The Reversalist - vocals (2020–present)
 Becoming the Archetype - vocals (1999-2011, 2022-present), bass (2003-2011, 2022-present)

Former
 Pneuma – vocals - (2011–2012)
 Solamors – vocals (2012–2015)

Timeline

Discography

With Becoming the Archetype

As Nonexistent Failure 
Demos
 In Loving Memory of Everything... I Never Had (2002)

As The Remnant 
Demos
 Death, Destruction, and Mayhem (2003)
Studio albums
 The Remnant (2004, self-released)

As Becoming the Archetype 
Studio albums

Singles
 "Necrotizing Fasciitis" (non-album digital single, 2009, Solid State)
 "O Holy Night" (non-album digital single, 2011, Solid State)

Music videos
 "Endure" (The Physics Of Fire) – 2007
 "The Magnetic Sky" (Celestial Completion) – 2011
 "Breathing Light" (Celestial Completion) – 2011

With Solamors 
Studio albums

With Death Therapy 
EPs
Demo Songs - 2015/2016 [Limited to 200 physical copies. Tracks listed in table below.]

Studio albums
 The Storm Before the Calm (2017)
 Voices (2019)
 Melancholy Machines (2021)

Guest appearances
"Reject" by Living Sacrifice (2010; Live)
"Nemesis" by Hope for the Dying (2016)
"Burden" by Dire (2017)
"Black Hole" by TheLeadBassist (2022)

References

American performers of Christian music
American male singers
American heavy metal guitarists
Living people
People from Dacula, Georgia
American male guitarists
Christian metal musicians
Singers from Georgia (U.S. state)
Guitarists from Georgia (U.S. state)
1983 births